The Government of the State of New York, headquartered at the New York State Capitol in Albany, encompasses the administrative structure of the U.S. state of New York, as established by the state's constitution. Analogously to the US federal government, it is composed of three branches: executive, legislative, and judicial. The head of the executive is the governor. The Legislature consists of the Senate and the Assembly. The Unified Court System consists of the Court of Appeals and lower courts. The state is also divided into counties, cities, towns, and villages, which are all municipal corporations with their own government.

Executive
The elected executive officers are:

There are several (limited to twenty) state government departments:

 Department of Agriculture and Markets
 Department of Audit and Control
 Department of Civil Service
 Department of Corrections and Community Supervision
 Department of Economic Development
 Education Department
 Department of Environmental Conservation 
 Executive Department
 Department of Family Assistance
 Department of Financial Services
 Department of Health
 Department of Labor
 Department of Law
 Department of Mental Hygiene
 Department of Motor Vehicles
 Department of Public Service
 Department of State
 Department of Taxation and Finance
 Department of Transportation
 Department of Veterans’ Services

Regulations are promulgated and published in the New York State Register and compiled in the New York Codes, Rules and Regulations (NYCRR). There are also numerous decisions, opinions, and rulings of state agencies.

Legislature
The New York State Legislature is bicameral and consists of the New York State Senate and the New York State Assembly. The Assembly consists of 150 members; the Senate varies in its number of members, but currently has 63. The Assembly is headed by the speaker; the Senate is headed by the president, a post held ex officio by the lieutenant governor, who only has a tie-breaking "casting vote", but more often it is presided over by the temporary president or by a senator of the majority leader's choosing.

The Legislature is empowered to make laws, subject to the governor's power to veto a bill. However, the veto may be overridden by the Legislature if there is a two-thirds majority in favor of overriding in each House. Furthermore, it has the power to propose amendments to the New York Constitution by a majority vote and then another majority vote following an election. If so proposed, the amendment becomes valid if agreed to by the voters at a referendum. The session laws are published in the official Laws of New York. The permanent laws of a general nature are codified in the Consolidated Laws of New York.

Committees 
The New York State Senate has 32 standing committees, this ranks them second place to Mississippi which has 35. The Assembly on the other hand has 37 standing committees which compared to other houses of the nation is the 5th largest. Committees have legislative jurisdiction for the communities or agencies they represent. Committees are responsible for reviewing bills before deciding to report them to the voting floor.

Standing committees on the Assembly side includes: Aging, Agriculture, Alcoholism and Drug Abuse, Banks, Children and Families, Cities, Codes, Consumer Affairs and Protection, Corporations, Correction, Economic Development, Education, Election Law, Energy, Environmental Conservation, Ethics, Governmental Employees, Governmental Operations, Health, Housing, Insurance, Judiciary, Labor, Libraries and Education Technology, Local Governments, Mental Health, Oversight/Analysis and Investigation, Racing and Wagering, Real Property Taxation, Rules, Small Businesses, Social Services, Tourism/Parks/Arts and Sports Development, Transportation, Veterans Affairs and lastly the Ways and means committee.

Senate Standing Committees: Administrative Regulations Review Commission, Aging, Agriculture, Alcoholism And Substance Abuse, Banks, Budget And Revenues, Children And Families, Cities, Civil Service And Pensions, Codes, Commerce, Economic Development And Small Business, Consumer Protection, Corporations, Authorities And Commissions, Crime Victims, Crime And Correction, Cultural Affairs, Tourism, Parks And Recreation, Domestic Animal Welfare, Education, Elections, Energy And Telecommunication, Environmental Conservation, Ethics And Internal Governance, Finance, Health, Higher Education, Housing, Construction And Community Development, Insurance, Internet And Technology, Investigations And Government Operations, Judiciary, Labor, Legislative Commission On Rural Resources, Legislative Women's Caucus, Libraries, Local Government, Mental Health And Developmental Disabilities, New York City Education, Racing, Gaming And Wagering, Rules, Science, Technology, Incubation And Entrepreneurship, Social Services, State-Native American Relations, Task Force For Demographic Research And Reapportionment, The New York State Black, Puerto Rican, Hispanic And Asian Legislative Caucus, Transportation, Veterans, Homeland Security And Military Affairs, Women's Issues.

Session 
The New York State Assembly Legislative session is a cycle that takes place from the first month of the year up until a budget has been published by both houses. According to the New York State Legislative Calendar, session convenes January 9th throughout June 19th. Budget deadline is the last week of March, but historically it has dragged on 'til the month of August and can even surpass that if the Senate and the Assembly fails to compromise. During session both houses work both together and independently to introduce bills and propose changes or support for the governor's executive budget.

During the legislative session for both houses (Senate and Assembly):

 Bills are introduced  and voted on to become law or not
 Resolutions/Proclamations are adopted 
 Changes to the governor's Executive Budget are proclaimed

Judiciary

The New York State Unified Court System interprets and applies the law of New York, ensures equal justice under law, and provides a mechanism for dispute resolution. The court system in New York tends to produce mild confusion for outsiders. In general, the judicial system is composed of the trial courts, consisting of the superior courts and the local courts, and the appellate courts.

The appellate courts are the:

 Court of Appeals
 Appellate Division of the Supreme Court 
 appellate terms of the Supreme Court
 appellate sessions of the County Court

The superior courts are the:

 Supreme Court
 County Court
 Family Court
 Surrogate's Court
 Court of Claims

And the inferior courts are the local courts:

 NYC Criminal Court and NYC Civil Court
 District Court outside New York City
 City courts outside New York City
 justice courts (town and village courts)

The highest court of appeal is the Court of Appeals (instead of the "Supreme Court") whereas the primary felony trial court is the County Court (or the Supreme Court in New York City). The Supreme Court also acts as the intermediate appellate court for many cases, and the local courts handle a variety of other matters and are the starting point for all criminal cases. The New York City courts make up the largest local court system. The system is administered by the chief judge of the Court of Appeals, also known as the chief judge of New York, the chief administrative judge, the Office of Court Administration and other agencies.

Local government

The state is divided into counties, cities, towns, and villages, which are all municipal corporations with their own government that provide most local government services. Whether a municipality is defined as a city, town, or village is not dependent on population or land area, but rather by the form of government selected by the residents and approved by the New York State Legislature. Each such government is granted varying home rule powers as provided by the New York Constitution, and a local law has a status equivalent with a law enacted by the Legislature (subject to certain exceptions and restrictions). New York also has various corporate entities that serve single purposes that are also local governments, such as school and fire districts as well as New York state public-benefit corporations, frequently known as authorities or development corporations. New York has 62 counties, which are subdivided into 932 towns and 62 cities; it also has 10 Indian reservations. In total, the state has over 3400 active local governments and over 4200 taxing jurisdictions.

In 1898, when New York City was consolidated into its present form, all previous town and county governments within it were abolished in favor of the present five boroughs and unified, centralized city government (the New York City government).

Other governments

Tribal government

Native Americans' governments are significantly independent of the state and its local governments. New York cannot interfere with tribal self-government, but may regulate conduct on tribal territory concerning non-Native Americans. For example, federal law forbids states and local authorities to tax Indian lands; however, the state can and does tax sales of cigarettes to non-tribe members on tribal territory.

See also 
 Politics of New York (state)
 Elections in New York
 Law of New York
 New York State Common Retirement

Citations

General and cited references

Further reading

External links
 
 New York Open Data Portal
 New York State Contract Reporter from the Department of Economic Development
 State agency contracts on Open Book New York from the Department of Audit and Control
 State of New York recipient profile on USAspending.gov

 
New York
Organizations based in Albany, New York